Sesotho – the language of the Basotho ethnic group of South Africa and Lesotho – has a complex system of kinship terms which may be classified to fall under the Iroquois kinship pattern. The complex terminology rules are necessitated in part by the traditional promotion of certain forms of cousin marriage among the Bantu peoples of sub-Saharan Africa. Most of the terms used have common reconstructed Proto-Bantu roots.

Due to the importance of family, the terms are limited to relatives through birth (consanguinity) and marriage (affinity). Adoption – the modern legal variety or the older common-law/traditional variety – is no different from birth. Marriage is not distinguished from birth, except for the names of sons- and daughters-in-law, and the terminology treats relatives through marriage to be no different from relatives through birth.

The adoption of an Iroquois kinship system is necessitate by the fact that traditionally large families lived together in compounds, and married children rarely lived far from their parents. Thus, the nuclear family is far larger and comprises far more categories than the father-mother-children pattern which is common in modern European culture.

Generations
Iroquois systems make the most terminology distinctions in the generation of the "ego" (oneself) – one's siblings and cousins – and this generation's parents (mother/father and aunts/uncles) and immediate offspring (children and nephews/nieces). These are the generations directly involved in cousin marriage, and the seemingly complicated terminology shows a certain symmetry when one considers the difference between cross-cousins and parallel cousins.

Above these three strata, all relatives are grandparents, and below all strata are grandchildren – even in the face of a lack of direct ancestry or descent.

Ego's parents generation
In Iroquois kinship systems, the complexity stems from promotion and/or prohibition of certain forms of cousin marriage, resulting in a form of symmetry called bifurcate merging where the parents of one's cross-cousins have a set of names different from the parents of one's parallel cousins.

Ones mother's female relatives of the same generation are considered one's mothers, and one's father's male relatives of the same generation are considered one's fathers. Moreover, one cannot marry their fathers' or mothers' children (siblings and parallel cousins), but is allowed/encouraged to marry every other relative of the same generation (cross-cousins).

The Sesotho system displays a slight bit more complexity than the standard Iroquois systems in that, when it comes to one's mothers and fathers, the terminology further classes them based on relative age to one's biological parents.

In the chart below, vertical placement signifies relative age, with relatives above one's biological parents being older than one's parents, and vice versa.

|-
|style="text-align: left;"|
 class="wikitable"
-
! Relationship !! Name !! Explanation
-
Ego    
-
 Mother     
-
 Father      
-
 Mother's brother     Ma- prefix ("mother") plus Proto-Bantu suffix *-dúme indicating masculinity; literally "male mother"
-
 Mother's older sister     The same word as "grandmother", signifying "old mother"
-
 Mother's younger sister     Mma ("mother") plus diminutive suffix; literally "small mother"
-
 Father's sister     Ra- prefix ("father") plus Proto-Bantu suffix *-kádî́ indicating femininity; literally "female father"
-
 Father's older brother    The same word as "grandfather", signifying "old father"
-
 Father's younger brother    Ra- ("father") plus diminutive suffix; literally "small father"

|-
|style="text-align: left;"|Notes:

Ego's generation
The most complexity is displayed in the terms used by one to refer to male and female relatives in one's own generation. Immediate siblings and parallel cousins have similar terms, while cross-cousins all have a single name  derived from the verb - ("give birth"), denoting the fact that cross-cousin marriage is encouraged.

|-
|style="text-align: left;"|Notes:

The words used by ego when referring to his/her siblings depend on ego's gender, the relative age of ego's sibling, and whether ego is talking about their sibling (nominative) or to their sibling (vocative).

When speaking to the sibling directly, the names in the table above are used, but when directly speaking to a sibling younger than oneself it is more usual to use their name directly without a title prefix.
Additionally, the name  may used when speaking about/to a younger sibling of the opposite gender.

Ego's children's generation
For the generation directly below that of the ego, the names one uses for the children of one's siblings, cross-cousins, and parallel cousins are simply determined by whether or not one has the same gender as the relative on the same generation, who is the child's parent. In particular, all children who are related to the ego by a parent of the same gender as the ego are referred to as one's children, whereas everyone else from this generation is referred to by the generic term .

If ego has married their motswala or even "sibling", then that relation's children – who are also ego's biological children – will simply be given the same name as ego's children without further complication.

|-
|style="text-align: left;"|Notes:

In summary, ego can marry a relative only if ego's parents call that relative . This bars marriage to parallel cousins as well as relatives in generations above and below oneself.

Remaining generations
If the specific generation of one's grandchildren is important, then it can be marked by successively applying diminutive suffixes to the word , giving
 – grandchild
 – great-grandchild
 – great-great-grandchild
 – great-great-grandchild
etc.

Ego's spouse and in-laws
In the vocative, relations through marriage are not distinguished from relations through birth/adoption. However, to avoid ambiguity, in the nominative there exist special terms for parents-in-law and children-in-law. It is worth noting that the terms for a female ego's parents-in-law literally mean "my (parallel) cousin's mother" and "my (parallel) cousin's father", even if one did not marry their cousin; this a relic of the traditional encouragement of parallel cousin marriage.

|-
|style="text-align: left;"|Notes:

A male calls simply calls his parents-in-law "mother " and "father", but in the nominative a woman may call her in-laws by the gender-neutral term .

Notes

References
Hammond-Tooke, W. D., 2004. Southern Bantu origins: light from kinship terminology. Southern African Humanities Vol. 16 Pages 71–78 Pietermaritzburg December 2004
Molalapata, B. T., 2004. The treatment of kinship: Terminology in Sotho dictionaries, with special reference to Setswana. M.A. Lexicography thesis. Pretoria: Univ. of Pretoria.

Sotho
Sotho people
Sotho culture
Sotho language